Lazar Jakovlevich Behrmann (September 26, 1830 – April 27, 1893) was a Russian educator and editor.

Biography
Lazar Behrmann was born to a Jewish family in Friedrichstadt, Courland (today Jaunjelgava, Latvia) in 1830. He received his early education in the ḥeder and in the district school of his native town, where he began his vocation as private teacher. 

In 1854 he settled in Mitau, where in 1861 he opened a private school for Jewish boys. The Jewish community of Saint Petersburg invited him in 1864 to found its first Jewish school, which remained under his management until his death. From 1869 to 1882 he was instructor in the Jewish religion at the Kolomenskaya Women's College in Saint Petersburg. 

He was also the author of Osnovy Moiseyeva Zakona ('Fundamentals of the Mosaic Law'), a popular guide to Jewish jurisprudence, and of Sankt-Peterburgskiya Yevreiskiya Uchilishcha ('Jewish Schools in Saint Petersburg').

He died after a long illness on April 27, 1893.

References
 

1830 births
1893 deaths
19th-century Latvian Jews
19th-century educators from the Russian Empire
19th-century Jews from the Russian Empire
19th-century writers from the Russian Empire
Editors from the Russian Empire
Jewish educators
Men from the Russian Empire
People from Courland Governorate
People from Jaunjelgava